Tvedestrand Church is a parish church of the Church of Norway in Tvedestrand Municipality in Agder county, Norway. It is located in the town of Tvedestrand. It is the church for the Tvedestrand parish which is part of the Aust-Nedenes prosti (deanery) in the Diocese of Agder og Telemark. The red, brick church was built in a long church design in 1860 using plans drawn up by the architect Georg Andreas Bull. The church seats about 300 people.

History
The town of Tvedestrand was established in 1836. The people of the new town did not have a church of their own so as the town grew, plans were made for a new church to be built in the town. The foundation stone was laid on 26 July 1860 and the church was consecrated by the bishop on 20 November 1861. The cemetery was opened on 28 November 1866.

Media gallery

See also
List of churches in Agder og Telemark

References

Tvedestrand
Churches in Agder
Brick churches in Norway
19th-century Church of Norway church buildings
Churches completed in 1861
1861 establishments in Norway